The Platinum Album may refer to:
 The Platinum Album (Vengaboys album)
 The Platinum Album (Judith Durham album)

See also
 Platinum album